= Marine lightwheels =

Rare phenomenon in the ocean

Marine lightwheels is a rare phenomenon that has been reported in the ocean. They appear as rotating columns of light that float in shallow depths.

== Description ==
These lightwheels have been reported mostly in the India Ocean. These lightwheels typically rotate at high speeds around an axis. They form at nighttime, or during light showers.
